Taipei Nan Shan Plaza is a skyscraper in Xinyi Special District, Xinyi, Taipei, Taiwan. It is the second tallest building in Taipei (after Taipei 101) and the third tallest building in Taiwan (after Taipei 101 and 85 Sky Tower). As of 2019, it is the 146th-tallest building in Asia and 248th-tallest building in the world.

Architecture
It was designed by Japanese architecture firm Mitsubishi Jisho Design Inc. The height of building is 272 m, the floor area is 192,154.99m2, and it comprises 48 floors above ground, as well as 5 basement levels. The lower level shopping mall is operated by Breeze Center.

The architectural plan of Taipei Nan Shan Plaza consists of three parts: a 7-story complex mall, a 48-story tower, and a diamond-shaped entrance building with an open art space. The 272-meter-tall tower is now the second tallest building in Taipei, and will be the highest-ranking office building in East Asia, with the aim of becoming the first choice for multinational companies to set up corporate headquarters.

The complex shopping mall is from the 3rd floor to the 7th floor. It will introduce international fashion brands, which are expected to drive the fashion trend of Taipei. The wide and traversable shopping malls ease the dense visuals of skyscrapers in the Xinyi Special District as well as providing an open view for the public. At the same time, the basement will plan 31 parking spaces for buses and large vehicles, in order to effectively solve issues with parking.

As for the diamond-type architectural design of Songren Road in the east, considering the requirements of Taipei as a global city, Taipei Nan Shan Plaza includes public art spaces of about 1600m2. After completion, it will be used as an important venue for receiving foreign guests and important ceremonies. The use of fundraising activities can also be provided to public welfare arts and cultural activities or small-scale commercial activities, art exhibitions, etc., which can inject more art and culture into the Xinyi District where financial and commercial gatherings are concentrated.

In addition, the surroundings of the tower will be planned with a number of open green public spaces, combined with parks, sidewalks and bicycle lanes, with benches between the mall and the office building

Another major feature of Taipei Nan Shan Plaza is that it will connect the surrounding buildings such as Taipei 101, ATT 4 FUN and Vieshow Cinema with underground passages or pedestrian bridges, and connect the core area of Xinyi Business Circle into a three-dimensional pedestrian network. The existing flat walkway and plaza space allow the public to directly transfer from the MRT "Taipei 101/World Trade Center" via Taipei Nanshan Plaza and the Xinyi Business Circle to the Taipei City Hall Bus Station. It will also cooperate with Taipei 101 after its completion to create an even better New Year's fireworks show.

Gallery

See also 
 Shin Kong Life Tower
 Taipei 101
 Gate of Taipei
 Taipei Century Plaza
 List of tallest buildings in Taiwan
 List of tallest buildings in Taipei

References

External links

Taipei Nanshan Plaza - The Skyscraper Center

2018 establishments in Taiwan
Pou Chen Group
Shopping malls in Taipei
Xinyi Special District
Skyscraper office buildings in Taipei
Office buildings completed in 2018